The East Lancs Myllennium Lowlander is the type of double-decker bus body built on the DAF/VDL DB250 chassis by East Lancashire Coachbuilders. The name "Lowlander" was derived from the chassis being built by a company from The Netherlands.

History

The Myllennium Lowlander superseded the East Lancs Lowlander, which was never released in the original design due to no orders being placed, therefore no examples of the previous model were built. East Lancs decided to retain the Lolyne/Myllennium Lolyne name for their bodies for Dennis Trident 2s rather than change the name to Lowlander, as they felt the name's association with The Netherlands would make it a fitting name for their body for the DAF DB250. It was eventually released in 2001, only ever being sold with East Lancs' "Myllennium" design. This is what has resulted in the Myllennium Lowlander, its new name, also being informally referred to as simply the Lowlander.

Specifications
The structure of the Lowlander was built using the Alusuisse "System M5438" system, for optimum strength. Glazing was with laminated glass, and gasket glazing came with the bus as standard - with bonded glazing available - and had hopper opening windows. The heating was thermostatically controlled and windows and air vents provided ventilation. The seating was trimmed in customer's required moquette. The floor had a 12mm Xyligen Basileum treated Finnish Birch combi plywood floor on the lower deck and both the upper and lower decks a non-slip flooring. Electrical features were the fluorescent light in the bus' ceilings, and twin circular halogen headlights. Also, CCTV was available. Destination displays only came as manual as standard, doors were air operated and were made of toughened glass. A simple driver's compartment was designed, to make the driver's job easier. Two pack acrylic paint was available for the exterior.

See also

 List of buses
 For the single decker, see East Lancs Myllennium
 For the double-deck body on Dennis Trident 2 chassis, see East Lancs Myllennium Lolyne
 For the double-deck body on Volvo B7TL, see East Lancs Myllennium Vyking

References

External links

 DAF (VDL)

Double-decker buses
Low-floor buses
Myllennium Lowlander
Vehicles introduced in 2000